Terminalia rerei is a species of plant in the Combretaceae family. It is endemic to the Solomon Islands.  It is threatened by habitat loss.

References

rerei
Vulnerable plants
Endemic flora of the Solomon Islands
Taxonomy articles created by Polbot